Mahamanikya (also Manikpha) was a Borahi-Kachari king of Barāha who ruled parts of Assam in the 14th-15th century. At the time, his kingdom centered on present-day Nagaon, Morigoan and Hojai districts. At his behest and patronage Madhava Kandali translated the Sanskrit epic Ramayana to Assamese verse called Saptakanda Ramayana. Some historians suggest that he was also involved—along with Indranarayana of Kamata kingdom and Baro-Bhuyans—in resisting Sikandar Shah's invasion into the Brahmaputra valley around 1362.

Notes

References

 
 
 
 
 
 

Indian royalty